Anne-Marie Sirois (born 1958) is a visual artist, writer and film director of Acadian descent living in New Brunswick, Canada.

Career 
She was born in Saint-Basile and received a bachelor's degree in visual arts from the Université de Moncton. She attended animation workshops with the National Film Board of Canada and directed her first animated film Les joies de Noël in 1985.

In 1995, she published her first children's book Le Petit Chaperon Mauve. That was followed by Rose Neige et les six nains in 2000. Sirois has also illustrated story books and textbooks.

Sirois has created a number of sculptures which incorporate irons. These sculptures have been exhibited at various galleries in New Brunswick, Quebec and Ontario. In 2010, she published an art book Pourquoi 100 fers.

She has also done performance art in 2016 at the Aberdeen Cultural Centre titled Grille cheese, where she made grilled cheese sandwiches.

Selected works 
 Ma gribouille tigrée, children's book (2006)
 Pssst, short film (2003)
 Joséphine, National Film Board short (2000)
 Animastress, National Film Board short (1994)
 Maille, Maille, National Film Board short (1987)
 L'avertissement, short film (1986)
 Les joies de Noël, short film (1985)

Awards 
 Award of merit for L'Avertissement at the Atlantic Film Festival, 1986
 Award of excellence for Maille Maille at the Atlantic Film Festival, 1987
 Silver Apple Award for Maille Maille at the  National Educational Film and Video Festival in Oakland, California, 1989
 Best Acadian film for Joséphine at the Festival international du cinéma francophone en Acadie, 2000
 : Artist of the year in film video television from the Association acadienne des artistes professionnels du Nouveau-Brunswick, 2000 and 2004
 Prix Éloize: Artist of the year in visual arts, 2012

References

External links 
 

1958 births
Living people
Artists from New Brunswick
Canadian women sculptors
Canadian women film directors
Canadian illustrators
Canadian children's writers in French
Writers from New Brunswick
Université de Moncton alumni
Acadian people
21st-century Canadian women artists
Film directors from New Brunswick
Canadian women children's writers